The siege of Candia (now Heraklion, Crete) was a military conflict in which Ottoman forces besieged the Venetian-ruled capital city of the Kingdom of Candia. Lasting from 1648 to 1669, or a total of 21 years, it is the second-longest siege in history after the siege of Ceuta. It ended with an Ottoman victory, but the effort and cost of the siege contributed to the decline of the Ottoman Empire, especially after the Great Turkish War.

Background
In the 17th century, Venice's power in the Mediterranean was waning as Ottoman power grew. The Republic of Venice believed that the Ottomans would use any excuse to pursue further hostilities.

In 1644, the Knights of Malta attacked an Ottoman convoy on its way from Alexandria to Constantinople. They landed at Candia with the loot, which included the former Chief Black Eunuch of the Harem, the kadi of Cairo, among other pilgrims heading to Mecca.

In response, 60,000 Ottoman troops led by Yusuf Pasha disembarked on Venetian Crete with no apparent target, with many suspecting them heading for Malta. Instead, the Ottomans surprisingly struck against Crete in June 1645, besieging and occupying La Canea (modern Chania) and Rettimo (modern Rethimno). Each of these cities took two months to be conquered. Between 1645 and 1648, the Ottomans occupied the rest of the island and prepared to take the capital, Candia.

Siege

The siege of Candia began in May 1648. The Ottomans spent three months laying siege to the city, cutting off the water supply, and disrupting Venice's sea lanes to the city. They would bombard the city for the next 16 years to little effect.

The Venetians, in turn, sought to blockade the Ottoman-held Dardanelles to prevent the resupply of the Ottoman expeditionary force on Crete. This effort led to a series of naval actions. On 21 June 1655 and 26 August 1656, the Venetians were victorious, although the Venetian commander, Lorenzo Marcello, was killed in the latter engagement. However, on 17–19 July 1657, the Ottoman navy soundly defeated the Venetians. The Venetian captain, Lazzaro Mocenigo, was killed by a falling mast.

Venice received more aid from other western European states after the 7 November 1659 Treaty of the Pyrenees and the consequent peace between France and Spain. However, the Peace of Vasvár (August 1664) released additional Ottoman forces for action against the Venetians in Candia.

In 1666, a Venetian attempt to recapture La Canea failed. The following year, Colonel Andrea Barozzi, a Venetian military engineer, defected to the Ottomans and gave them information on weak spots in Candia's fortifications. On 24 July 1669, a French land/sea expedition under Francois de Beaufort not only failed to lift the siege, but also lost the fleet's vice-flagship, La Thérèse a 900-ton French warship armed with 58 cannons, to an accidental explosion. This dual disaster was devastating to the morale of the city's defenders.

Chastened by their failed relief effort and the loss of so valuable a warship, the French abandoned Candia in August 1669, leaving Captain General Francesco Morosini, the commander of Venetian forces, with only 3,600 fit men and scant supplies to defend the fortress. He, therefore, accepted terms and surrendered to Ahmed Köprülü, the Grand Vizier of the Ottoman Empire on 27 September 1669. However, his surrender without first receiving authorization from the Venetian Senate made Morosini a controversial figure in Venice for some years afterward.

As part of the surrender terms, all Christians were allowed to leave Candia with whatever they could carry. At the same time, Venice retained possession of Gramvousa, Souda and Spinalonga, fortified islands that shielded natural harbors where Venetian ships could stop during their voyages to the eastern Mediterranean. After Candia's fall, the Venetians somewhat offset their defeat by expanding their holdings in Dalmatia.

Proposed biological warfare attack 
Data obtained from the Archives of the Venetian State, relating to an operation organized by the Venetian Intelligence Services, describes a plan aimed at lifting the siege by infecting the Ottoman soldiers with plague; this was to be done by attacking them with a liquid made from the spleens and buboes of plague victims. "Although the plan was perfectly organized, and the deadly mixture was ready to use, the attack was ultimately never carried out." According to a scholar from the USA's National Defense University, this attack was previously unknown to historians of biological warfare until published in December 2015.

Other participants
 Knights of Malta fought at the siege of Candia (in Crete) in 1668
 Francois de Beaufort, who died there
 Philippe de Montaut-Bénac, marshal under the duke of Beaufort
 Philippe de Vendôme, the nephew of the duke of Beaufort
 Vincenzo Rospigliosi, admiral of the fleet and Pope Clement's nephew
Georg Rimpler, German engineer
 Charles de Sévigné
 Louis de Buade de Frontenac

In fiction

The siege of Candia is an integral part of the background to the historical novel An Instance of the Fingerpost, where a significant protagonist is a Venetian veteran of that siege and several plot developments become clear through extensive flashbacks to the Candia events.

See also
 Naval battles of the Cretan Wars
 History of the Republic of Venice
 Ottoman Navy
 Ottoman wars in Europe

References

 The War for Candia, by the VENIVA consortium.
 Venice Republic: Renaissance, 1645–69 The war of Candia, by Marco Antonio Bragadin.
 The Cretan War – 1645–1669 by Chrysoula Tzompanaki (in Greek).

1640s conflicts
1650s conflicts
1660s conflicts
17th century in Greece
1640s in the Ottoman Empire
1650s in the Ottoman Empire
1660s in the Ottoman Empire
Kingdom of Candia
Candia
Candia
Candia
Military history of Greece
Heraklion
Cretan War (1645–1669)